Will Not End Here (Nije kraj) is a 2008 Croatian / Serbian co-production directed by Vinko Brešan. It is based on a play by Mate Matišić.

Cast 
The cast also includes Luka Peroš best known for his role of Marseille in Money Heist.

 Ivan Herceg - Martin
 Nada Šargin - Desa
 Predrag Vušović - Djuro 
 Inge Appelt - Marija / Jacqueline
 Dražen Kühn - Kriminalac
 Mladen Vulić - Nikola
 Leon Lučev - Martinov kolega
 Damir Orlic - Martinov kolega II
 Ljubomir Kerekeš - Doktor
 Luka Peroš - Vojvoda
 Robert Ugrina - Border policeman
 Luka Juričić - Jacqueline's grandson
 Alen Šalinović - Gluhak

References

External links
 

2008 films
2000s Croatian-language films
Croatian films based on plays
Croatian comedy films
Serbian comedy films
2008 comedy films